Citrumelo (× Citroncirus spp.) is also called Swingle citrumelo trifoliate hybrid, because it is cold hardy and is a hybrid between a 'Duncan' grapefruit and a trifoliate orange (Poncirus trifoliata (L.) Raf.), developed by Walter Tennyson Swingle. 

Citrumelo is widely employed as a citrus rootstock, being resistant to the severe citrus tristeza virus and to phytophthora root rot as well as to blight, cold, and citrus nematode.
It produces yellow fruit which taste (if added sugar) and smell like an ordinary grapefruit. The trees are very hardy and can survive temperatures into the teens (Fahrenheit).

Taxonomy

Trifoliate orange, according to Swingle, belongs to a citrus related genera, called Poncirus, while grapefruit equivocally belongs to the genus citrus, hence the botanical name × citroncirus is a hybrid genus, derived from citrus and poncirus.

References

External links

Citrus
Citrus hybrids